Rezvan Rural District is a rural district (dehestan) in Kalpush District, Meyami County, Semnan Province, Iran. At the 2006 census, its population was 10,837, in 2,500 families.  The rural district has 8 villages.

References 

Rural Districts of Semnan Province
Meyami County